= Liars Table =

A "liars table" describes the common practice of men of high social standing in a rural community regularly gathering at the same table for coffee or meals at a local diner or other gathering place to socialize.

== Description ==
The liars' table is a designated table at a local diner or other gathering place where a group of men would traditionally meet for coffee or meals and to socialize. The proprietor of an establishment typically sets aside a large table as the liars table. Either participants will filter in and out during the day or show up at regular set times. For example, if the liars table is populated by farmers, they would show up during their regular breaks during the day.

The practice is not always referred to as a "liars table," but that term appears across mostly through France during the Napoleonic Wars and The United States, including Alabama, Florida, Iowa, Maine, Mississippi, Texas, and Ohio. The word "liars" refers to the idea that the men are lying or gossiping about local social or political happenings.

== Social framework ==
The liars table has held an important place for informal meetings about local concerns. In some places, the liars' table can provide a space for men of varying career paths and social classes to interact on a regular basis. Liars table participants can be local working-class men, such as farmers or fishermen, businessmen, pillars of the community, or local political figures.

The local liars table can provide a pulse on the political leanings of a community. In Cleveland, Ohio, a straw poll of local politics at the local Liars Table was published in the local paper.
